XXX may refer to:

Codes and symbols
 30 (number), Roman numeral XXX
 XXX, designating pornography
 XXX, an X rating
 .xxx, an internet top-level domain intended for pornographic sites
 XXX, a symbol of the straight edge lifestyle
 XXX, the squadron markings of No. 29 Squadron RAF
 XXX (beer), marks in beer measurement
 XXX, an urgency code used with SOS
 XXX (tag), a possible tag in a comment in programming
 XXX (currency), the ISO 4217 code for "no currency"
 XXX, the ISO 9362 (SWIFT/BIC) branch subcode for "primary office"
 XXX, "unspecified nationality" on a machine-readable passport
 XXX, a feature of the coat of arms of Amsterdam
 Flag of Amsterdam
 A gaming term used as a padding prefix or suffix

Arts, entertainment and media

Fictional characters
 Anya Amasova or Agent XXX, a character in the James Bond film The Spy Who Loved Me

Film and television
 XXX (film series), American action film series
 XXX (2002 film), an action film starring Vin Diesel
 XXX: State of the Union, 2005 
 XXX: Return of Xander Cage, 2017 
 XXX (web series), a 2018 Hindi erotic drama
 XXX: Exklusibong, Explosibong, Exposé, a Philippine current affairs television show
 XXX, the production code for the 1974 Doctor Who serial Death to the Daleks

Music
 XXX (music group), a South Korean Hip hop music group
 XXX (Asia album), 2012
 XXX (Danny Brown album), 2011
 XXX (Jimmy Edgar album), 2010
 XXX (ZZ Top album), 1999
 XXX Tour, supporting the ZZ Top album
 XXX, a 1987 album by Miguel Bosé
 XXX (soundtrack), soundtrack to the 2002 film
Chicago XXX, a 2006 album by Chicago 
 XXX (EP), by Pussy Riot
 "X X X" (L'Arc-en-Ciel song), 2011
 "XXX" (Kendrick Lamar song), 2017
 "XXX", a single by The Bohicas, 2014

Video games
 BMX XXX, a 2002 action sports game featuring off-color and sexual humor
 XXX (video game), a 2002 action game based on the film of the same name

Organisations
 XXX Corps (United Kingdom), a corps of the British Army during the Second World War
 XXX Corps (Pakistan), a corps of the Pakistan Army

People
 Chinu Xxx (born 1987) a British freestyle wrestler

Other
XXX model, a variant of the quantum Heisenberg model of magnetic ordering
Electrolux Model XXX (Model 30), the longest-selling vacuum cleaner manufactured by Aerus
Trisomy X, also known as triple X syndrome, a chromosomal disorder in which a female has an extra copy of the X chromosome

See also
 
 3X (disambiguation)
 Triple Cross (disambiguation)
 Triple X (disambiguation)
 Triplex (disambiguation)
 X (disambiguation)
 XX (disambiguation)
 XXXX (disambiguation)
 Kiss
 XXXTentacion, American rapper, singer, and songwriter
 XXX syndrome